James Thomas Alexander (August 25, 1888 – January 16, 1952) was a United States Navy captain who served as the 37th naval governor of Guam. He served as a commanding officer of ships during both World War I and World War II, receiving the Navy Cross for his actions during the First World War. He was an outspoken advocate for increased naval power and bases to improve American defensive networks. As governor, he improved the defenses of Guam by building additional military facilities, dredging the Apra Harbor, increasing the officers on the island, and building a sea wall.

Life
Alexander was born on August 25, 1888, and lived much of his life in Kansas. He died on January 16, 1952.

Naval career
Alexander graduated from the United States Naval Academy in 1910. While there, he rowed for the Navy Midshipmen men's crew team. During World War I he served as commanding officer of both the USS Sterett and the USS Porter, for which he received the Navy Cross. Following the war, he commanded the Navy Ammunition Depot in Hawaii. In the 1930s, Alexander proved a strong advocate for the strengthening of American sea power as the key to maintaining a healthy national defense. He commanded the USS Wichita during World War II. He retired from the Navy as a captain.

Governorship
Alexander served as Naval Governor of Guam from February 8, 1938 to April 20, 1940. Air travel became more prevalent during his tenure as more people traveled to the island from the mainland United States and air mail arrived frequently. He recommended various methods to make the island more defensible, including building additional warehouses and harbor facilities, dredging Apra Harbor, constructing a sea wall and oil storage facilities, and the erection of six new officers barracks. He had to negotiate with the Japanese government in arranging the return of a number of Japanese fisherman who had been rescued when their ship Daichs Saiho Maru sunk in a restricted area of the Guamanian coast. He also oversaw the 1940 United States Census on the island.

References

External links
 James Thomas Alexander at ourcampaigns.com

1888 births
1952 deaths
People from Wichita, Kansas
United States Naval Academy alumni
Recipients of the Navy Cross (United States)
United States Navy personnel of World War I
United States Navy personnel of World War II
Governors of Guam
Military theorists